Wicksell is a surname. Notable people with the surname include:

 Katarina Wicksell (born 1979), Swedish footballer
 Knut Wicksell (1851–1926), Swedish economist
 Ragnar Wicksell (1892–1974), Swedish football player
 Sven Dag Wicksell (1890–1939), Swedish statistician

See also
 Wicksell effect
 Wicksell's theory of capital

Swedish-language surnames